The second season of the Russian reality talent show The Voice premiered on 6 September 2013 on Channel One. Dmitry Nagiev returns as the show's presenter. Dima Bilan, Pelageya, Alexander Gradsky, and Leonid Agutin return as coaches. Sergey Volchkov won the competition and Alexander Gradsky became the winning coach for the second time.

Coaches and presenter 

Dima Bilan, Pelageya, Alexander Gradsky, and Leonid Agutin return for their 2nd season as coaches.

Dmitry Nagiev returns for his 2nd season as a presenter.

Teams 
Colour key

Blind auditions 
Colour key

Episode 1 (6 September) 
The coaches performed "Blue Suede Shoes" at the start of the show.

Episode 2 (13 September)

Episode 3 (20 September)

Episode 4 (27 September)

Episode 5 (4 October)

Episode 6 (12 October)

The Battles 
The Battles round started with episode 7 and ended with episode 10 (broadcast on 18, 25 October 2013, on 1, 8 November 2013).
'Steals' were introduced this season, where each coach could steal two contestants from another team when they lost their battle round.

Colour key:

The Knockouts 
The Knockouts round started with episode 11 and ended with episode 13 (broadcast on 15, 22, 29 November 2016).

After the Battle Round, each coach had 9 contestants for the Knockouts. The contestants were not told who they were up against until the day of the Knockout. Each contestant sang a song of their own choice, back to back, and each knockout concluded with the respective coach eliminating one of the three contestants.

The top 24 contestants will then move on to the "Live Shows."

Colour key

Live shows
Colour key:

Week 1, 2: Quarterfinals (6 and 13 December) 
The Top 24 performed on Fridays, 6 and 13 December 2013. The two artists with the fewest votes from the each team left the competition by the end of the each episode.

Week 3: Semifinal (20 December) 
The Top 8 performed on Friday, 20 December 2013. The one artist with the fewest votes from the each team left the competition.

Week 4: Final (27 December) 
The Top 4 performed on Friday, 27 December 2013. This week, the four finalists performed two solo cover songs and a duet with their coach.

Reception

Rating

The Voice (Russian TV series)
2013 Russian television seasons